Yuzhno-Kurilsk Mendeleyevo Airport  is an airport in Yuzhno-Kurilsk, on the Russian and Japanese island of Kunashir in the Kuril Islands.

Airlines and destinations 

The following airlines offer scheduled passenger service:

References

Airports built in the Soviet Union
Airports in Sakhalin Oblast
Sakhalin